Robert Joseph Hazell (born 14 June 1959) is a former professional footballer who made 266 league appearances in a 12-year career in the English Football League between 1977 and 1989. Born in Jamaica, he represented England at under-21 level. His nephew is the former Oldham Athletic defender Reuben Hazell, and his son Rohan is a non-League player.

A big physical defender, he began his career at Wolverhampton Wanderers, featuring in the FA Youth Cup final in 1976. He moved on to Queens Park Rangers in 1979. He helped QPR to the Second Division title in 1982–83, and also played in the 1982 FA Cup Final. He moved on to Leicester City in 1983, and had a brief spell back on loan at Wolves in 1985, before he signed with Reading. He joined Port Vale in December 1986, and was a regular for the "Valiants" until a back injury forced his retirement in June 1989.

Club career

Wolverhampton Wanderers
Hazell was born in Kingston, Jamaica. He began his career at Wolverhampton Wanderers, and featured in the 1976 FA Youth Cup final, which ended in a 5–0 aggregate defeat to West Bromwich Albion. He turned professional at Molineux under Sammy Chung, and played 20 First Division games for Wolves in the 1977–78 season; despite only making his debut in December and being sent off in a 2–1 defeat to Arsenal in the FA Cup, he made such an impact in a central defensive partnership with John McAlle that he picked up the club's second ever Player of the Year award. He played 13 games in the first half of the 1978–79 campaign before transferring to Queens Park Rangers for a £240,000 fee, who had just been relegated into the Second Division.

Queens Park Rangers
In 1979, he played in a benefit match for West Bromwich Albion player Len Cantello, that saw a team of white players play against a team of black players. Rangers finished fifth in 1979–80 under the stewardship of Tommy Docherty, two places and four points behind promoted Birmingham City. Following this disappointment, Terry Venables was put in charge at Loftus Road. The "Hoops" then dropped to eighth position in 1980–81, before rising to fifth again in 1981–82, just two points behind promoted Norwich City. Hazell played for QPR in the 1982 FA Cup Final against Tottenham Hotspur at Wembley, and provided the assist for Terry Fenwick to make the original tie a 1–1 draw. However a Glenn Hoddle penalty was enough to hand "Spurs" a 1–0 victory in the replay. Perhaps his most impressive performance though came in the semi-final against West Bromwich Albion, where he marked Cyrille Regis out of the game. Promotion was finally achieved in 1982–83, as Rangers won the Second Division title by a ten-point margin.

Leicester City to Reading
Hazell transferred to First Division rivals Leicester City in September of the 1983–84 campaign for a fee of £100,000. He helped Gordon Milne's "Foxes" to post a 15th-place finish in 1984–85, but became plagued by injury problems. He had a brief loan spell at old club Wolves in 1985–86, but could do little to prevent Sammy Chapman's side from slipping into the Fourth Division. He left Filbert Street and moved on to Second Division side Reading for the 1986–87 season, but made just four league appearances for Ian Branfoot's "Royals", before leaving Elm Park.

Port Vale
He joined Port Vale in December 1986. His signing proved to be another master-stroke by manager John Rudge, and along with defensive partner Phil Sproson, Hazell quickly shored up the "Valiants" defence before the end of season run-in to steer the club out of the Third Division relegation zone to a 12th-place finish. He went on to serve as club captain, setting an example with his performances whilst commanding respect with his mentality and presence. He was the first black player to captain the club. He played 52 league and cup games in 1987–88, and gained some measure of revenge over Tottenham Hotspur in the FA Cup as he helped Vale to snatch a memorable 2–1 win; it was reported that he successfully intimidated Clive Allen by knocking him to the ground and telling him that "You’re going to get that for the next eighty-five minutes". Hazell was a regular feature in the first eleven until he received a back injury in January 1989. He made seventeen league appearances in Vale's 1988–89 promotion season, but injury meant he was unable to play in the play-off final victory over Bristol Rovers. Unable to overcome a back injury, he was given a free transfer in June 1989, having made 100 club appearances in all competitions at Vale Park.

International career
During his time at Wolves he represented the England under-21 and England 'B' teams.

Style of play

Post-retirement
After leaving the game, Hazell became a Sports Prevention Manager, working to help rehabilitate young offenders through sport.

Career statistics

Honours
Individual
Wolverhampton Wanderers Player of the Year: 1977–78

Wolverhampton Wanderers
FA Youth Cup runner-up: 1976

Queens Park Rangers
FA Cup runner-up: 1982
Football League Second Division: 1982–83

References

Sportspeople from Kingston, Jamaica
Black British sportspeople
English footballers
England B international footballers
England under-21 international footballers
Jamaican emigrants to the United Kingdom
Association football defenders
Queens Park Rangers F.C. players
Wolverhampton Wanderers F.C. players
Leicester City F.C. players
Luton Town F.C. players
Reading F.C. players
Port Vale F.C. players
English Football League players
1959 births
Living people
FA Cup Final players